Le Franc is a 1994 Senegalese short comedy film, directed by Djibril Diop Mambéty.

Le Franc is about Marigo, a penniless musician living in a shanty town, relentlessly harassed by his formidable landlady.

This film uses the French government's 50% devaluation of the West African CFA franc in 1994, and the resulting hardships as the basis for a whimsical commentary on using the lottery for survival.

Le Franc was originally intended as the first film of a trilogy under the title, Tales of Ordinary People. However, Mambety’s untimely death in 1998 prevented the completion of the third film.

Synopsis
Marigo the musician dreams with his instrument – a congoma – confiscated by his landlady because he never pays the rent. He gets hold of a lottery ticket and decides to put it in a safe place while he waits for the draw: he glues it to the back of his door. The night of the draw, fortune blinds Marigo, he is the proud owner of the winning ticket. He already sees himself as a millionaire, with a thousand congomas, an orchestra and a private plane… He even has visions of the charismatic Aminata Fall, symbol of capitalism in Africa. But there is small problem; the ticket is glued to the door…

Cast
 Demba Bâ as "Dwarf"
 Dieye Ma Dieye as "Marigo"
 Aminata Fall as "Landlady"

Release
Le Franc was released on DVD coupled with La petite vendeuse de Soleil (The Little Girl who Sold the Sun) and is distributed by California Newsreel Productions.

References

Bibliography

External links
 
 
 
 

1994 short films
1994 films
Senegalese comedy films
Wolof-language films
1994 comedy films
Films directed by Djibril Diop Mambéty
Films shot in Senegal
1995 comedy films
1995 films
Senegalese short films